Jeffrey Terry Green (born March 15, 1977) is an American billionaire businessman, who co-founded AdECN, a demand-side advertising platform, which was acquired by Microsoft in 2007. Following two years at Microsoft, Green left to co-found buy-side digital advertising platform The Trade Desk, of which he is chairman and CEO.

Early life
Green earned a Bachelor of Arts degree from Brigham Young University in 2001  and a degree in marketing communications from the University of Southern California.

Career
Green started his career as technical account manager in the MSN division of Microsoft, based in Salt Lake City. In 2003, he founded AdECN to bring programmatic trading to digital advertising. AdECN became the first demand-side advertising exchange service, which he sold to Microsoft in 2007, becoming COO of AdECN Exchange. In 2009, Green co-founded The Trade Desk, a second-generation, programmatic advertising technology company, with fellow former Microsoft employee Dave Pickles.

In September 2016, The Trade Desk launched its IPO (NASDAQ: TTD), with an opening day reported as “a huge vote of confidence for the demand-side platform,” and since cited as one of the best-performing stocks in the market, with its stock trading at nearly 14 times the IPO price less than three years later.

Green has appeared on Bloomberg TV, Business Insider, CNBC, Fox Business, NPR and The Wall Street Journal. In 2017, he appeared on 60 Minutes to discuss how consumers can avoid fake news and, in 2019, Green launched an instructional video series on digital advertising concepts.

On August 23, 2019, Green sold 288,000 shares of The Trade Desk at an average price of $258.27 per share for a total sale of $74.4 million.

Affiliations and awards
From 2011 to 2012, Green served on the Networks and Exchanges Quality Assurance Guidelines Committee for the Interactive Advertising Bureau (IAB). Green also served on the boards of European global advertising technology companies Falk Technologies and IncreaseOnline, and has served as an advisor to AppNexus and SiteWit.

In 2015, Green was among the American Marketing Association 4 Under 40 Emerging Leaders; Forbes named The Trade Desk to its top 10 of America's Most Promising Companies; and Green and Pickles were also both named Ernst & Young Entrepreneur of the Year Award recipients in the Greater Los Angeles region, for which Green had also been a finalist in 2014. Green and The Trade Desk support NPOs Water.org, The Charity Defense Council, Thorn, and Not Impossible.

Personal life
Green lives in Newbury Park, California, in Thousand Oaks, northwest of Los Angeles. He is divorced and has two sons and a daughter. He served a mission for the Church of Jesus Christ of Latter-day Saints in the California Ventura Mission, but is now disassociated, having publicly criticized the church in 2021 for hindering equality and global progress, resigning his membership in 2021, and donating $600,000 to an LGBTQ rights organization. An "aggressive philanthropist", according to the Wall Street Journal, he started the Jeff T. Green Family Foundation in June 2020 and joined The Giving Pledge in November 2021, promising to donate 90 percent of his wealth during his lifetime.

References

Living people
American billionaires
American company founders
Brigham Young University alumni
University of Southern California alumni
Former Latter Day Saints
1977 births